Kitchen Kallakar is an Indian television cookery game show in Marathi language originally aired on Zee Marathi. It was hosted by Sankarshan Karhade and judged by Prashant Damle.

Cast 
 Hosted by :- Sankarshan Karhade, Shreya Bugade
 Judged by :- Prashant Damle, Nirmiti Sawant
 Rajchef :- Jayanti Kathale, Madhura Bachal
 Sheth of Peth :- Pranav Raorane

Contestants

Seasons

Special episode 
 9 January 2022

References

External links 
 Mast Majedar Kitchen Kallakar at ZEE5
 Masaledar Kitchen Kallakar at ZEE5

Zee Marathi original programming
Marathi-language television shows
Indian reality television series
2021 Indian television series debuts
2022 Indian television series endings